Amydria onagella is a moth of the family Acrolophidae. It is found in North America, including California.

References

Moths described in 1905
Acrolophidae